Miguel Osório de Almeida (September 1, 1890 – December 2, 1952, both in Rio de Janeiro) was a noted Brazilian physician and scientist, brother of another scientist, Álvaro Osório de Almeida, both considered the fathers of modern physiology in Brazil.

He studied medicine at the Faculdade de Medicina do Rio de Janeiro which presently is part of the Federal University of Rio de Janeiro. He was the chairman of physiology of the School of Agriculture and Veterinary Medicine of Rio de Janeiro and of the Instituto Oswaldo Cruz, the dean of the Universidade do Rio de Janeiro and member of the Brazilian Academy of Letters.

He was author or co-author of several important studies on neurophysiology. He received the "Einstein Award" by the Brazilian Academy of Sciences and the "Sicard Prize" by the French Academy of Medicine in Paris. He was also one of the inspirers of the foundation of the Brazilian Society of Physiology (1957) and a member of the Brazilian Academy of Sciences.

1890 births
1952 deaths
Brazilian scientists
Brazilian physiologists
Members of the Brazilian Academy of Letters
Federal University of Rio de Janeiro alumni
People from Rio de Janeiro (city)
Members of the Brazilian Academy of Sciences
20th-century Brazilian scientists